Denver is an unincorporated community in Preston County, West Virginia, United States. South Preston School is located along West Virginia Route 26 in Denver.

References

Unincorporated communities in Preston County, West Virginia
Unincorporated communities in West Virginia
Morgantown metropolitan area